

Loch Eriboll (Scottish Gaelic: "Loch Euraboil") is a  long sea loch on the north coast of Scotland, which has been used for centuries as a deep water anchorage as it is safe from the often stormy seas of Cape Wrath and the Pentland Firth.

Bronze Age remains can be found in the area, including a souterrain and a very well preserved wheelhouse on the hillside above the west shore. A small scale lime industry developed here in the 19th century and Ard Neakie, a promontory on the eastern shore of the loch, had four large lime kilns developed in around 1870. Before the development of the coast road around the loch in 1890, the Heilam ferry ran from the quay at Portnancon on the west shore to Ard Neakie. Both Ard Neakie and Portnancon were fishing stations.

Eilean Hoan is located at the northern, seaward end of the loch and there are various small islets in the vicinity including A' Ghoil-sgeir, An Cruachan, An Dubh-sgeir, Eilean Clùimhrig, and Pocan Smoo. Today it is a largely unspoilt wilderness, in a region of high rainfall and with the lowest population density in the UK.

Naval use
The Royal Navy have been frequent visitors to the loch, particularly during World War II. There are stones arranged by sailors into the names of their warships, including   and Amethyst, on the hillside above the hamlet of Laid. It was nicknamed "Lock ’orrible" by the British servicemen stationed here during the war because of the often inclement weather. The largest island in the loch, Eilean Choraidh, was used as a representation of the German battleship Tirpitz for aerial bombing practice by the Fleet Air Arm prior to the successful Operation Tungsten in April 1944.

A leased area of the shore and loch is classified as a Minor training area by the Defence Training Estate, generally being used for amphibious and specialist training for three fortnights per year.

In 2011 the loch was used as part of Exercise Joint Warrior, the largest war games staged in the UK, involving the navy's new flagship, the assault ship HMS Bulwark.

See also

 List of lighthouses in Scotland
 List of Northern Lighthouse Board lighthouses

References

Notes

External links

Panorama of Loch Eriboll (QuickTime required)
 Northern Lighthouse Board 

Sea lochs of Scotland
Lochs of Highland (council area)
Loch Eriboll